Pietro Willy Ruta (born 6 August 1987) is an Italian rower. He competed in the men's lightweight double sculls with Elia Luini at the 2012 Summer Olympics, and in the men's lightweight quadruple sculls at the 2016 Summer Olympics, finishing in 4th.

He won a bronze medal in the men's lightweight double sculls at the 2020 Summer Olympics with Stefano Oppo.

Biography
At the World Championships, he won a silver medal in the men's lightweight double sculls in 2017, 2018 and 2019, and in the men's lightweight single sculls in 2011.

References

External links
 
 Pietro Ruta at Fiamme Oro

1987 births
Living people
Italian male rowers
Rowers at the 2012 Summer Olympics
Rowers at the 2016 Summer Olympics
Rowers at the 2020 Summer Olympics
Olympic rowers of Italy
World Rowing Championships medalists for Italy
European Championships (multi-sport event) bronze medalists
Mediterranean Games gold medalists for Italy
Mediterranean Games medalists in rowing
Competitors at the 2013 Mediterranean Games
Rowers of Marina Militare
Rowers of Fiamme Oro
Medalists at the 2020 Summer Olympics
Olympic medalists in rowing
Olympic bronze medalists for Italy
20th-century Italian people
21st-century Italian people